Aurelio Aureli (Venice, before 1652 – id. after 1708) was an Italian librettist.

Life 
Little is known about Aureli's life. He began his operatic career in 1652 with L'Erginda. Until 1687, he worked as a librettist mainly in Venice, except for a brief trip to Vienna. In Venice he was a member of the Accademia degli Imperfetti and perhaps also of the Accademia degli Incogniti. From 1688 to 1694 he was, however, in the service of the Duke of Parma, during which time he wrote a dozen plays, almost all of which were subsequently set to music by the court composer Bernardo Sabadini. The last librettos were written in Venice and other cities of the Republic.

Work 
His works include over 50 libretti, including:
 Erismena (1655), set to music by Francesco Cavalli
 Le fortune di Rodope e Damira, Pietro Andrea Ziani, Venise (1657);
Giovanni e Paolo, (1665);
 Alessandro Magno in Sidone, set to music by Marc'Antonio Ziani, Venise, Teatro Grimano ai Santi Giovanni e Paolo, Carnaval 1679; Naples, Royal Palace of Naples, 6 November 1679, then Vicence, Teatro di Piazza, 1682, then under the title La Virtù Sublimata dal Grande, overo il Macedone continente, Venise, Teatro di Cannaregio, 1683; Padoue, Teatro Obizzi, 26 December 1706;
 Talestri innamorata d'Alessandro Magno, Bernardo Sabadini;
 La ninfa bizzarra, Marc'Antonio Ziani, Novo Teatro sulla Brenta, Dolo (1657), (several times revived), Rovigo, in 1706 under the title Gli amanti delusi, Venise, in 1708 under the title Il cieco geloso set to music by Polani, San Giovanni in Persiceto, in 1729 under thee title Amore e gelosia set to music by Buini; then taken over by Johann Adolf Hasse);
 Rosane imperatrice degli Assirij, Venice, end of the 17th century.
 Medea, Venise, 1675, music by Zanettini (ou Gianettini). This opera opened the Hangar du Quai aux Foins in Brussels on 24 January 1682, the precursor of la Monnaie inaugurated in 1700.

References

Further reading 
 Anna Amalie Abert: Aurelio Aureli, in Die Musik in Geschichte und Gegenwart. Allgemeine Enzyklopädie der Musik, vol. 1, Kassel 1956, pp. 452–455.
 Aurelio Aureli and Marc'Antonio Ziani, Alessandro Magno in Sidone, Padova, CLEUP, 2013
 Emmanuele Antonio Cicogna, Illustri Muranesi richiamati alla memoria e offerti alla gentilissima signora Ludovica Bigaglia-Bertolini, Venice, Tipografia Martinengo, 1858
 Claudio Mutini, Aurelio Aureli (s.v.), in Dizionario Biografico degli Italiani, Firenze, Istituto della Enciclopedia Italiana, 1960.

External links 
 

Musicians from Venice
17th-century Venetian writers
Italian librettists
Date of birth unknown
Date of death missing